USS Linnet (AMS-24/YMS-395) was a  built for the United States Navy during World War II.

Linnet was laid down on 11 July 1942 by Harbor Boat Building of Terminal Island, California, launched on 15 July 1943, and completed 19 November 1943. She was commissioned USS YMS-395 on 20 November 1943.

After shakedown off San Pedro, California, she continued ASW patrols off the California coast until 7 March 1944, when she sailed for Pearl Harbor. The minesweeper then sailed for the Marshall Islands arriving Majuro 18 April. For the next 16 months YMS-395 engaged in patrol operations, convoy escort duty, and minesweeper services in the Marshall and Gilbert Islands. Together with similar ships of her type, she played an important role in defeat of Japan by keeping the staging harbors clear of enemy mines,

After the Japanese surrender, YMS-395 departed Guam 14 September 1945, touching several islands before arriving San Pedro, California, 26 October. She remained on the West Coast until May 1946 performing experimental minesweeping tests and after arriving Charleston, South Carolina, on 13 June she continued similar exercises alone the East Coast.

YMS-395 was renamed USS Linnet (AMS-24) on 18 February 1947, and later that month was assigned to the Mine Warfare School, Yorktown, Virginia. From 1947 until 1957 Linnet operated along the west coast and performed experiments and exercises in all phases of mine warfare. She was reclassified MSC(O)-24 on 7 February 1955 and decommissioned at Philadelphia, Pennsylvania, 13 September 1957.

Linnet was placed in service as a U.S. Naval Reserve training ship 30 October 1959, and was assigned to the 4th Naval District for duty at Atlantic City, New Jersey.

Struck from the Naval Vessel Register on 1 October 1968 and sold sometime after, the veteran minesweeper's ultimate fate is unknown.

References

External links 
 

YMS-1-class minesweepers of the United States Navy
Ships built in Los Angeles
1943 ships
World War II minesweepers of the United States
Training ships of the United States Navy
Cold War minesweepers of the United States